Garcia Álvarez de Figueroa  was a Spanish soldier who was Governor of the Margarita Province, based on Isla Margarita off the coast of what today is Venezuela, from 1626 to 1630.

In December 1619 Admiral Álvarez de Figueroa was with a fleet of six galleons that set out from Cadiz with instructions to pass through the Strait of Magellan without stopping in Brazil.
The fleet ran into a violent storm and was forced to run back to land, with most of the ships run aground on Cape Trafalgar and many people drowned. Only the galleon that held Admiral Garcia Alvarez de Figueroa and the cosmographer Diego Ramirez de Arellano stayed afloat.

Admiral Garcia Álvarez de Figueroa was appointed Governor and Captain General of the Island of Margarita on 30 April 1625.
He took over from Andrés Rodríguez de Villegas on 1 June 1626.
He was accompanied by his son Gerónimo. 
Figueroa was known for his interest in letters, for his contempt of the local Waikerí people, and for his enjoyment of the trade in pearls from Cubagua and the Macanao Peninsula.
He was succeeded by Juan de Eulate, a former governor of New Mexico who was appointed governor of Margarita Province on 10 April 1630.

References
Citations

Sources

Governors of Margarita Province
Margarita Island